During the Cold War period former Southeast European country of the Socialist Federal Republic of Yugoslavia established and maintained significant political, cultural and economic exchanges and relations with newly independent African states. While majority of multilateral exchanges were organized via Non-Aligned Movement and the United Nations, significant cooperation developed with the Organisation of African Unity as well, predecessor to contemporary African Union. Yugoslavia was the only non-African country which participated in funding of the Liberation Committee of the Organisation of African Unity. While being a uniquely involved in the workings of the body the country nevertheless preferred bilateral relations with individual liberation movements. The Organisation of African Unity included the Non-Alignement principle in its charter while Yugoslavia consider the organisation to be the only legitimate representative for the entire African continent throughout the Cold War era. Yugoslavia therefore followed common OAU line in its own policies towards issues in Africa.

Context

Yugoslavia, contrary to many Western Bloc countries in Europe did not have any direct colonial past which complicated relations between former Metropoles and newly independent states. The country believed that its own historical experiences of foreign domination by Austro-Hungarian and Ottoman empire, challenges in development and complex multi-ethnic federalist structure are akin to experiences of newly independent post-colonial countries in Africa. At the same time, from the 1948 Tito–Stalin split onwards the country was not anymore under the sphere of influence of the Soviet Union and was instead focused on non-Bloc countries. As the maneuvering space for neutral countries in deeply divided Europe was shrinking Yugoslavia turned its foreign policy focus on new allies among former colonies and mandate territories, primarily in Africa and the Middle East.

Yugoslav construction firm Energoprojekt constructed and designed the Kampala International Conference Center in 1975 to accommodate the 13th Summit of the Organization of African Unity. Yugoslav architect Mario Jobst was invited to work on the conference center for the 14th OAU Summit in Libreville as well. Some exchanges remained at the level of planning with Yugoslav architect Branko Petrović creating the general plan for the headquarters building of the Organisation of African Unity in Addis Ababa in early 1960's which was never implemented in practice.

Gallery

Yugoslav Foreign relations with African States

See also
 Foreign relations of the African Union
 Yugoslavia and the Non-Aligned Movement
 Museum of African Art, Belgrade
 Yugoslavia–European Communities relations
 Africa–China relations
 List of United States ambassadors to the African Union

References

Foreign relations of the African Union
Foreign relations of Yugoslavia
Foreign relations of Africa